Datuk Mohamaddin bin Ketapi (born 3 June 1957) is a Malaysian politician who served as the Minister of Tourism, Arts and Culture in the Pakatan Harapan (PH) administration under former Prime Minister Mahathir Mohamad from July 2018 to the collapse of the PH administration in February 2020. He served as the Member of Parliament (MP) for Lahad Datu from October 2019 to November 2022 and for Silam from May 2018 to October 2019, Member of the Sabah State Legislative Assembly (MLA) for Segama since September 2020 and Lahad Datu from August 1986 to October 1990. He also served as the State Assistant Minister of Industrial and Rural Development of Sabah in the United Sabah Party (PBS) state administration under former Chief Minister Joseph Pairin Kitingan from 1986 to 1990. He is a member of the United Malays National Organisation (UMNO), a component party of the ruling Barisan Nasional (BN) coalition. He was also member of the Parti Bangsa Malaysia (PBM), member of the Malaysian United Indigenous Party (BERSATU), a component party of the ruling Gabungan Rakyat Sabah (GRS) and Perikatan Nasional (PN) coalitions, member of the Heritage Party (WARISAN) and member of the PBS. He has also served as the 1st State Chairman of PBM of Sabah from August 2022 to his resignation from the party in January 2023. On 30 October 2021, he left WARISAN and became independent in support for GRS. Later, he officially became a member of BERSATU on 26 November 2021. However on 28 June 2022, he left BERSATU and became independent again in support for BN and GRS ruling coalitions after joining it only seven months prior.  He then joined PBM and was appointed as its State Chairman of Sabah exactly two months later after leaving BERSATU on 28 August 2022.On 6 January 2023, he left PBM and joined UMNO and supported its withdrawal of support for GRS that triggered the 2023 Sabah political crisis.

Political career 
Mohamaddin supports the curfew that was imposed in eastern Sabah to combat the rampant cross border crimes perpetrated by bandits from the neighbouring southern Philippines.

Controversy and Issue 
Mohamaddin Ketapi was speaking at a campaign for the 2020 Sabah state election which he allegedly insulted Malaysian security forces who fought during the 2013 Lahad Datu standoff by saying that the fight between 235 militants from the Philippines and the Malaysian army was just a 'theatre play'.

Following public backlash, Mohamaddin offered his apology but not before asserting that the speech was taken out of context.

Elections

2018 general election 
In the 2018 election, Sabah Heritage Party (WARISAN) fielded him to contest the Silam parliamentary seat, facing the incumbent candidate Nasrun Mansur from the United Malays National Organisation (UMNO) and subsequently won.

Election results

Honours
  :
  Commander of the Order of Kinabalu (PGDK) – Datuk (2018)

References 

Living people
1957 births
People from Sabah
Members of the Dewan Rakyat
Government ministers of Malaysia
Sabah Heritage Party politicians
Alumni of the University of Buckingham
Commanders of the Order of Kinabalu
21st-century Malaysian politicians